Brian Magee (born 1975) is a Northern Irish former professional boxer.

Brian Magee may also refer to:
Brian Magee (cricketer) (1918–2006), Canadian cricketer
Bryan Magee, (1930–2019), British philosopher and politician

See also
Brian McGee (disambiguation)